Francesco Stella (born 24 April 1943), known professionally as Franco Stella, is an Italian architect.

Life 

Stella studied at the Università Iuav di Venezia in Venice. In the early 1970s he undertook teaching and research at Gruppo Architettura. In 1973 he was professor of architecture design at the IUAV. He has been Professor of Architectural Design at the Faculty of Architecture of the University of Genoa. In architectural terms, Stella views himself as a representative of classic modern rationalism.

On 28 November 2008, he won the architectural competition for the design of the reconstruction of the Berlin City Palace /HumboldtForum.

Buildings and designs (selection) 
 Head office ESTEL in Thiene (Veneto), 1972-1976
 Several school buildings in Veneto, 1970 
 Villa Thiene 1990
 Hall of Maserà di Padova, 1990
 Competition design for the Berlin Chancellery, 1994
 Design for the enlargement of the Stockholm City Library
 Two exhibition halls of the fair in Padua (along with Walter A. Noebel), 1998-2002
 Design for the Naumburg Nietzsche memorial
Berlin Palace - Humboldt Forum

Literature 
 Francesco Moschini: Franco Stella: Progetti di architettura, 1970–1990. Edizioni Kappa, Rom 1991, .
 Valter Balducci: Franco Stella: Progetti per la fiera di Padova. Il Polirafo, Padua 2005.
 Federico Motta Editore (Hrsg.): Franco Stella. Mailand, 2005.  (Werkbuch)
 Franco Stella: Schriften und Entwürfe. In: Franco Stella, Peter Stephan: Franco Stella. DOM Publishers, Berlin 2010, Bd. 1.

External links 
 Website of Franco Stella

References 

Architects from Venice
1943 births
Living people
People from Thiene
Academic staff of the University of Genoa